Michael Mushok (born April 10, 1970) is an American musician best known as the lead guitarist for the nu metal band Staind. He is a member of supergroup Saint Asonia and played in the band Newsted.

Life and career
Mushok was born in Ludlow, Massachusetts on April 10, 1970. He formed Staind in Springfield, Massachusetts in 1995 with Aaron Lewis, Johnny April, and Jon Wysocki. In 1997, before Staind was set to perform an opening concert set, headlining band Limp Bizkit's frontman Fred Durst confronted them regarding seemingly Satanic cover artwork on their debut album Tormented. The band convinced Durst that the image did not convey devil worship and their performance that evening impressed him enough that he signed them to Flip Records.

Staind released the albums Dysfunction in 1999, Break the Cycle in 2001, 14 Shades of Grey in 2003, Chapter V in 2005, The Singles: 1996–2006 in 2006, The Illusion of Progress in 2008, and their self-titled album in 2011 before going on hiatus in 2012. In 2014, Staind began to tour again briefly before going on a second hiatus. They reunited for a one-off set in August 2017 and again on an ongoing basis in September 2019.

In 2013, Mushok joined heavy metal band Newsted, fronted by former Metallica bassist Jason Newsted. After Newsted disbanded in 2014, and while Lewis pursued a solo career, Mushok joined Saint Asonia in 2015.

Personal life

Mushok is married and has two children.

References

Living people
1970 births
Guitarists from Massachusetts
People from Ludlow, Massachusetts
Lead guitarists
Alternative metal musicians
American heavy metal musicians
Alternative metal guitarists
Staind members
21st-century American guitarists
Saint Asonia members